The Lince (meaning "Lynx") was a  Spanish development programme for a proposed main battle tank that unfolded during the late 1980s and early 1990s. The intention was to replace the M47 and M48 Patton tanks that the Spanish Army had received under the U.S. Mutual Defense Assistance Act between 1954 and 1975, and to complement the AMX-30E tanks manufactured for the army during the 1970s. Companies from several nations, such as German Krauss-Maffei, Spanish Santa Bárbara, and French GIAT, made bids for the development contract. The main priorities were mobility and firepower, with secondary priority placed on protection; the Lince tank was to have been lighter and faster than its competitors. The vehicle's size would also have been restricted by the Spanish rail and highway network. To achieve a sufficient level of firepower and protection, given the size requirements, the Lince was to use Rheinmetall's 120 mm L/44 tank-gun and German composite armour from the Leopard 2A4.

The Spanish government decided to upgrade its fleet of AMX-30Es in the late 1980s. The focus on upgrading Spain's AMX-30E's distracted attention from the Lince plan, which was eventually shelved in 1990 after Spain acquired many M60 Patton tanks, which were no longer required by the U.S., in accordance with the Treaty on Conventional Armed Forces in Europe. These tanks replaced the M47s and M48s, and fulfilled Spain's need to modernize its tank forces in the short term. No prototype of the planned Lince tank was manufactured, and no announcements were made on who would receive the contract. Four years later the Spanish government procured and locally manufactured the Leopard 2, fulfilling the long-term modernisation goal established in the Lince programme.

Background
During the 1950s the Spanish Army was supplied by the United States with 552 M47 and M48 Patton tanks as a mutual defense pact against a potential Soviet invasion of Western Europe.  The first tanks were delivered in 1954, and the fleet was upgraded in the 1970s to equal the capabilities of M60 Patton tanks.  Spain was, however, interested in replacing these tanks as early as the 1960s with the French AMX-30 or German .  Spain eventually decided to buy the French tank and by 1975 the Spanish Army had 299 AMX-30s, designated as AMX-30Es. Of these, 280 tanks were manufactured by the local company Empresa Nacional Santa Bárbara (now Santa Bárbara Sistemas) who received the AMX-30 patent from the French company GIAT.  As the first batch of production of AMX-30s ended, the French Army and Santa Bárbara began a research programme for an eventual modernisation of the AMX-30 to correct deficiencies such as mechanical reliability, armor protection and the fire control system.  In fielding the AMX-30E, the army found its upgraded M47s and M48s to be outdated; its earliest M47 tank was more than 30 years old.  The army required a modern tank that could complement its AMX-30Es and started looking for a replacement for its Patton fleet.

Bidding

In 1984, the Spanish Ministry of Defense declared its intent to set aside 120 billion pesetas (1.1 billion U.S. dollars) for a future tank program and attracted interest from five foreign companies.  German company Krauss-Maffei and Spanish company Santa Bárbara presented a joint bid in mid-1984 that would produce a tank based on 1970s technology.  The French government proposed to cooperate with Spain in designing a tank complete with new technology—France would later develop this programme on its own as the AMX-Leclerc. However, the French admitted that there would be restrictions placed on Empresa Nacional Santa Bárbara when it came to exporting the tank.  The Italian government proposed a similar deal for a cooperative tank design. The American company General Dynamics and British company Vickers offered the M1 Abrams and Valiant, respectively; the Spanish government rejected their offers the following year because of the low likelihood of local production and export of the tank.  By late 1985, the only offers still under consideration were those from the German-Spanish collaboration and the French and Italian governments.

Krauss-Maffei's Lince bid provided the clearest technical designs. The tank would be 49 tonnes and equipped with a 120-millimeter main gun. It could fire this gun on the move and aim at targets with effectiveness in day and night operations. Although heavily based on the Leopard 2A4, the Lince was smaller and lighter, trading protection for mobility. Specifically, the Lince prioritised enhanced mobility over the irregular Spanish terrain. Furthermore, size restrictions were imposed because of the existing capabilities of Spain's railroad and highway network. Although the reduced armor conflicted with the problems that the Spanish had with AMX-30E's thin armor, the Lince used a multilayer armor similar to that of the German Leopard 2A4, providing greater protection than standard armor for a similar weight. The protection was further enhanced by the low profile turret, again similar to that of the Leopard 2A4.

In early 1986, the Ministry of Defense declared that it would choose a contract within a matter of months. News sources cited said that Krauss-Maffei would most likely gain the contract, although the French might get it because of past and existing French armament contracts with Spain.  Apart from producing the French-designed AMX-30, the Spanish government also had a contract for Mirage F1 fighter planes and Puma utility helicopters in 1979.  In early 1987, France again offered Spain the contract to co-develop and co-produce the AMX-Leclerc. This time it added the lucrative term of joint export.  Despite the offer and ongoing collaboration with the Italians, Spanish investment in the German-Spanish Lince program grew to 200 billion pesetas (1.8 billion dollars).  However, the Spanish government did not announce a winner for the contract. This indecision led Krauss-Maffei to freeze its bid for the Lince.  Krauss-Maffei also cited the loss of millions of dollars because of failures on the part of Santa Bárbara Sistemas, who would manufacture the Lince.

Decline of the programme

The Spanish Ministry of Defense agreed to modernise the Army's AMX-30Es in 1987 and allotted 16 billion pesetas (155 million dollars) to the programme.  From , the Army upgraded its entire AMX-30E fleet to EM1 and EM2 standards.  This upgraded programme posed a threat to the Lince programme.  Around the same time, the Spanish government expressed interest in acquiring American M60 Patton tanks that were being retired from Central Europe, in accordance with the Treaty on Conventional Armed Forces in Europe.  In October and November, the Spanish government began to negotiate for 400 to 500 M60A1 and M60A3 tanks, and planned to upgrade its acquired M60A1 tanks to M60A3 standards.  In December, the United States agreed to transfer 532 M60A1 and M60A3 tanks to replace Spain's M47s and M48s.  After receiving 50 of the 272 A1s, Spain cancelled procurement of these tanks and opted to receive only the 260 M60A3s.  Because of the modernisation of the AMX-30, the decision to replace older Patton tanks with the M60A3 and Krauss-Maffei's criticism of the management of the indigenous tank programme, the Lince was canceled in 1989.  Management issues in Santa Bárbara Sistemas also played a part, including yearly negative balances and the reduction of factory personnel.  However, unlike the planned Lince, the M60s only satisfied Spain's immediate need to modernise the Army's tank fleet in the short term.  They were not a long-term modernisation solution as Spain's M47s and M48s had already been upgraded to equivalents of the M60.

As a result, Spain negotiated with Germany over the procurement and local production of many Leopard 2A5s; a Memorandum of Understanding was signed between the two in 1995, and the Germans lent 108 Leopard 2A4s to the Spanish Army for five years starting in 1998. In 2005, the Spanish Ministry of Defense declared intention to buy the tanks instead of renting them. In comparison to the smaller Lince, the Leopard 2A4 weighs  and is powered by a  diesel engine. The greater weight of the Leopard 2A4 is due in part to its thicker armor, affording greater protection and balancing out the loss in mobility as compared to the Lince.

Comparison to the alternatives

See also 
 Tanks in the Spanish Army
 List of armoured fighting vehicles by country

References

Bibliography

 
 
 
 
 
 
 
 
 
 
 
 
 
 
 
 
 
 
 
 
 
 
 
 
 
 
 
 
 

Main battle tanks of Germany
Main battle tanks of Spain
Main battle tanks of the Cold War